Bayern 3 is a public radio station owned and operated by the Bayerischer Rundfunk (BR), the public broadcaster in the German state of Bavaria.

It started operating on 1 April 1971 as BR’s third radio channel. It is focused on pop music.

In February 2021, Bayern 3 host Matthias Matuschik faced criticism after an on air xenophobic tirade against South Korean boyband BTS.  Various hashtags began trending on Twitter over the weekend demanding an apology.

Bayern 3 was again criticized when instead of apologizing, they issued a statement blaming people for being offended and that Matuschik was stating an opinion.  Various artists condemned Matuschik’s words including Halsey, Lauv, Zara Larsson and others.  Another apology was issued, but Matuschik’s continued denial of wrongdoing led to more scrutiny.

More posts from Matuschik’s Instagram were revealed to also be racist.  The DJ deleted his Instagram on 28 February 2021.

References

Radio stations in Germany
Radio stations established in 1971
1971 establishments in West Germany
Mass media in Munich
Bayerischer Rundfunk